Kazemabad (also Romanized as Kāz̧emābād) is a village in Sirch Rural District, Shahdad District, Kerman County, Kerman Province, Iran. At the 2006 census, its population was 85, in 20 families.

References 

Populated places in Kerman County